Logofteni is a commune in Făleşti District, Moldova. It is composed of two villages, Logofteni and Moldoveanca.

References

Communes of Fălești District